Loganathan is a Tamil male given name. Due to the Tamil tradition of using patronymic surnames it may also be a surname for males and females. Loganathan is the Tamil equivalent of Loknath meaning "Lord of All worlds".

Notable people

Given name
 A. D. Loganathan (1888–1949), Indian soldier
 C. Loganathan (1913–1981), Ceylonese banker
 G. V. Loganathan (1954–2007), American engineer and academic

Surname
 Kethesh Loganathan (1952–2006), Sri Lankan political activist
 Loganathan Arumugam (1953–2007), Malaysian singer
 Thiruchi Loganathan, Indian singer
 Trichy Loganathan Maharajan (born 1960), Indian singer

See also
 
 

Tamil masculine given names